Triclisia macrophylla is a species of plant in the family Menispermaceae. It is found in Cameroon, Equatorial Guinea, and Sierra Leone. Its natural habitats are subtropical or tropical moist lowland forest and subtropical or tropical moist montane forest. It is threatened by habitat loss.

References

macrophylla
Critically endangered plants
Taxonomy articles created by Polbot
Taxa named by Daniel Oliver